Hamilton Square is an unincorporated community and census-designated place (CDP) located within Hamilton Township, in Mercer County, New Jersey, United States, that is the site of a historic colonial village. Until the 2000 Census the area was part of the Mercerville-Hamilton Square CDP, which was split into two CDPs as of 2010: Mercerville and Hamilton Square. As of the 2010 United States Census, the CDP's population was 12,784.

Hamilton Square was established in 1692 and was named after Alexander Hamilton in a wave of anti-British feeling at the time of the War of 1812. It previously had been called Nottingham after the British town. As of the 2010 United States Census, the CDP's population was 12,784.

Geography
According to the United States Census Bureau, Hamilton Square had a total area of 4.367 square miles (11.312 km2), including 4.343 square miles (11.249 km2) of land and 0.024 square miles (0.063 km2) of water (0.56%).

Demographics

Education
Schools that service the Hamilton Square area are: Morgan Elementary School, Sayen Elementary School, Langtree Elementary School, Alexander Elementary School, Robinson Elementary School, Reynolds Middle School, Crockett Middle School, Nottingham High School, and Steinert High School.

Notable people

People who were born in, residents of, or otherwise closely associated with Hamilton Square include:
 Conrad Daniels (born 1941), professional darts player who was active in the 1970s and 1980s.
 Dan Donigan (born 1966), retired soccer forward and current head coach of Rutgers University soccer team.
 Janice Harsanyi (1929-2007), soprano singer and college professor.
 Dahntay Jones (born 1980), professional basketball player, currently playing for the Indiana Pacers.
 Karin Miller (born 1977), former professional tennis player.
 George R. Robbins (1814-1875), represented  from 1855 to 1859.
 Robert "Bobby" Smith (born 1951), retired U.S. soccer defender and National Soccer Hall of Fame member.
John Taylor (1836-1909), creator of pork roll (aka Taylor Ham).
 John K. Rafferty (1938-2021) was mayor of Hamilton Township from 1976-1999, and also played a crucial role in Ronald Reagan's presidential campaign in New Jersey

References

Census-designated places in Mercer County, New Jersey
Hamilton Township, Mercer County, New Jersey